Carl Ditters von Dittersdorf (2 November 1739 – 24 October 1799) was an Austrian composer, violinist, and silvologist. He was a friend of both Haydn and Mozart.

Life

1739–1764 

Dittersdorf was born in the Laimgrube (now Mariahilf) district of Vienna, Austria, as Johann Carl Ditters. His father was a military tailor in the Austrian Imperial Army of Charles VI, for a number of German-speaking regiments. After retiring honorably from his military obligation, he was provided with royal letters of reference and a sinecure with the Imperial Theatre. In 1745, the six-year-old August Carl was introduced to the violin and his father's moderate financial position allowed him not only a good general education at a Jesuit school, but private tutelage in music, violin, French and religion. After leaving his first teacher, Carl studied violin with J. Ziegler, who by 1750, through his influence, secured his pupil's appointment as a violinist in the orchestra of the Benedictine church on the Freyung.

Prince Joseph of Saxe-Hildburghausen soon noticed young Ditters, and on 1 March 1751 hired him for his court orchestra. Under princely auspices he studied violin with Francesco Trani who, impressed with the ability of his pupil in composition, commended him to Giuseppe Bonno who instructed him in Fuxian counterpoint and free composition. After a few years Prince Joseph disbanded the orchestra, since he had to leave Vienna to assume the regency in Hildburghausen, and the Austrian Empress hired Dittersdorf for her own orchestra through Count Durazzo, Theatre Director at the Imperial Court. In 1761 he was engaged as violinist in the Imperial Theatre orchestra, and in 1762 as its conductor. It was during this period that he became acquainted with Christoph Willibald Gluck, who had just achieved greatness as an opera composer with the Vienna première of his Orfeo ed Euridice. In 1763 he traveled to Bologna with Gluck to see the opera Il trionfo di Clelia: an Italian tour that was to leave the greatest impression on his future work as a composer from both the Austrian Gluck and the contemporary Italian musical scene. In 1764 he traveled to Paris, a trip with only scarce and uncertain documentation. Back in Vienna in 1764, his contract with Count Durazzo expired that winter, but he met the great Joseph Haydn and became one of his closest friends.

1764–1774 
In 1764, Dittersdorf assumed the post of Kapellmeister at the court of Ádám Patachich, Hungarian nobleman and Bishop of Nagyvárad (Oradea, Romania). The following year he was introduced to Philipp Gotthard von Schaffgotsch, the Prince-Bishop of Breslau, who was in the process of creating a cultural centre around his court based at Château Jánský vrch (Johannesberg) in Javorník (today part of the Czech Republic). He accepted the post of Hofkomponist (court composer) in 1771, and it was during his tenure at Johannesberg that most of his creative output was produced. Over the next twenty years he wrote symphonies, string quartets and other chamber music, and opere buffe. In 1773 the prince-bishop appointed him Amtshauptmann of nearby Jeseník (Freiwaldau), one of several measures to help entice the cosmopolitan composer to remain at isolated Johannesberg. Since this new post required a noble title, Ditters was sent to Vienna and given the noble title of von Dittersdorf. His full surname thus became "Ditters von Dittersdorf", but he is usually referred to simply as "Dittersdorf".

Final years 
Johann Baptist Wanhal was perhaps Dittersdorf's most eminent pupil. About 1785, Haydn, Dittersdorf, Mozart and Wanhal played string quartets together, Dittersdorf taking first violin, Haydn second violin, Mozart viola and Wanhal cello. Eminent Irish tenor Michael Kelly, for whom Mozart created the roles of Don Basilio and Don Curzio in his da Ponte opera Le nozze di Figaro noted of their performance of Stephen Storace's String Quartet that, although they played well, their performance as a whole was not outstanding; but the image of four of the greatest composers of their time joining in common music-making remains an unforgettable vignette of the Classical era (comprising the second half of the eighteenth century).

In 1794, after twenty-four years at Johannesberg, Dittersdorf, after a serious clash with von Schaffgotsch, was expelled from his palace. Sometime the following year, he was invited by Baron Ignaz von Stillfried to live in his spare château known as Červená Lhota, in southern Bohemia. His final decade was occupied with overseeing operatic productions in addition to compiling and editing his own music for publication.

He died at Nový Dvůr (Neuhof, or "New Court") where Château Červená Lhota stood, and was buried in the town of Deštná. He finished his autobiography just three days before his death.

Style and fame 

Ditters' early work laid the groundwork for his later compositions.  His symphonic and chamber compositions greatly emphasize sensuous Italo-Austrian melody instead of motivic development, which is often entirely lacking in his works.  After some early Italian opere buffe, he turned to writing German Singspiele instead, with Der Apotheker und der Doktor (1786, generally known today as Doktor und Apotheker) in particular being a tremendous success in his lifetime, playing in houses all over Europe and recorded almost two centuries later. Among his 120-or-so symphonies are twelve programmatic ones based on Ovid's Metamorphoses, although only six have survived (and have also been recorded).  He also wrote oratorios, cantatas and concertos (among which are two for double bass and one for viola), string quartets and other chamber music, piano pieces and other miscellaneous works. His memoirs, Lebenbeschreibung ("Description of [My] Life"), were published in Leipzig in 1801. Some of his compositions, including the double bass concerto, were published in Leipzig by the Friedrich Hofmeister Musikverlag.

Works

Concertos 

 Grosses Concert per 11 strum. (1766)
 18 concertos for Violin
 3 concertos for 2 Violins
 5 concertos for Viola
 1 concerto for Cello
 2 concertos for Contrabass
 1 concerto for Viola and Contrabass
 1 concerto for Piano
 5 concertos for Oboe
 1 concerto for Oboe d'Amore
 5 concertos for Harpsichord
 2 concertos for Quartet
 2 concertinos

Concertos: manuscripts 
 Concerto for Oboe (in C major) (MS: Dittersdorf 32; now publ. Artaria)
 Concerto for Flute (in e minor) (MS: Dittersdorf 36; now publ. Artaria)
 Concerto for 2 Violins (in D major) (MS: mu6402.2532; now publ. Artaria)
 Concerto for 2 Violins (in C major) (MS: mu6402.2530; now publ. Artaria)

Concertos: selection of best known concertos 
 Concerto for Oboe in G major (Breitkopf & Härtel)
 Concerto for Oboe in C major (The Danish Royal Library)
 Concerto for Oboe in D major L.25b
 Concerto for Oboe in C major L.39
 Concerto for Oboe in C major L.40a
 Concerto for Oboe in C major L.24
 Concerto for Oboe in G major L.42
 Concerto for Oboe d'Amore in A major L.43b
 Concerto for Flute in e minor (The Danish Royal Library)
 Concerto for Cello in D major (The Danish Royal Library)
 Concerto for Contrabass (Double Bass Concerto) No.1 in E major (The Danish Royal Library)
 Concerto for Contrabass (Double Bass Concerto) No.2 in D major (The Danish Royal Library)
 Concerto for Contrabass (Double Bass Concerto) in E flat major (The Danish Royal Library)
 Concerto for Contrabass, Viola and Orchestra (The Danish Royal Library)
 Concerto for Viola and Orchestra in F major (The Danish Royal Library)
 Concerto for Violin and Orchestra in C major (The Danish Royal Library)
 Concerto for Violin and Orchestra in G major (The Danish Royal Library)
 Concerto for Harp, originally for cembalo, in A major (The Danish Royal Library)
 Concerto for Cembalo/Harpsichord in B major (The Danish Royal Library)
 Concerto for 2 Violins in D major L.2
 Concerto for 2 Violins in C major L.4
 Concertino for 2 Violins, 2 Violas, 2 Oboes, 2 Horns, Basson and Bass

Symphonies 
Dittersdorf left about 120 symphonies with solid attribution. There are about another 90 symphonies which may be Dittersdorf's work—according to the catalogue published by Helen Geyer, Torino 1985. Most of the symphonies are preserved only in manuscripts. Many manuscripts are inscribed di Carlo de Dittersdorf or similar, however they are copies of now lost original scores.

 Sinfonia nel gusto di cinque nazioni (Paris, 1767)
 6 Symphonies Op. 1 (Amsterdam, 1768?)
 6 Symphonies Op. 4 (Paris, 1769?)
 The Periodical Ouverture (London, 1769)
 3 Symphonies Op. 5 (Paris, 1769?)
 Symphonies Périodiques (Amsterdam, 1770–72)
 3 Symphonies Op. 6 (Paris, 1773?)
 4 Symphonies Op. 7 (Paris, 1773?)
 3 Symphonies Op. 8 (Paris, 1773?)
 6 Symphonies Op. 13 (Paris, 1781)

Symphonies: manuscripts 
 Grande symphonie: Le carnaval ou La redoute (MS)
I Minuetto
II Anglaise
III Concerto
IV Ballo Strassburgnese
V Polonaise
VI Ballo Tedesco
VII Kehraus
 Symphony (in A minor) Il deliro delli compositori, ossia Il gusto d’oggidi’ (MS: Ser.H Fasc.34 Nr.317; now publ. Artaria)
 Symphony (in A major) Nazionale nel gusto (MS: Ser.H. Fasc.39 Nr.76; now publ. Artaria)
 Symphony (in D major) Il combattimento delle passioni umane (MS: Ser.H Fasc.34 Nr.315; now publ. Artaria)
 Symphony (in F major) (Grave F7) (MS: Ser.H Fasc.34 Nr.312; now publ. Artaria)
 Symphony (in D minor) (Grave d1) (MS: R.M.21.a.13.(3.); now publ. Artaria)
 Symphony (in G minor) (Grave g1) (MS: S.m.15957; Ser.H Fasc.33 Nr.293; now publ. Artaria)
 Symphony (in E major) (Grave E1) (MS: IV-A-39 / A- 3498; now publ. Artaria)
 Symphony (in E flat major) (Grave Eb9) (MS: IV-A-59 / A-3515; now publ. Artaria)
 Symphony (in F major) (Grave F4) (MS: IV-A-38 / A-3497; now publ. Artaria)
 Symphony (in D major) (Grave D6) (MS: IV-A-66 / A-3522; now publ. Artaria)
 Symphony (in D major) (Grave D2) (MS: IV-A-51 / A-3509; now publ. Artaria)
 Symphony (in A major) (Grave A6) (MS: Ser.H Fasc.33 Nr.298; now publ. Artaria)
 Symphony (in B flat major) (Grave Bb5) (MS: Ser.H Fasc.34 Nr.313; now publ. Artaria)

Symphonies: selection of best-known symphonies 
 Sinfonia Concertante in D major (Breitkopf & Härtel)
 Sinfonia Concertante in D major for Viola, String Bass and Piano (International Music Company)
 Symphony in C major (Breitkopf & Härtel)
 Symphony in D major (Breitkopf & Härtel)
 Symphony in F major
 Symphony in D minor
 Symphony in G minor
 Symphony No. 1 in C after Ovid's “Metamorphoses” (“The Four Ages of the World”)
 Symphony No. 2 in D after Ovid's “Metamorphoses” (“The Fall of Phaeton”)
 Symphony No. 3 in G after Ovid's “Metamorphoses” (“The Metamorphosis of Acteon Into a Stag”)
 Symphony No. 4 in F after Ovid's “Metamorphoses” (“The Rescue of Andromeda by Perseus”)
 Symphony No. 5 in D after Ovid's “Metamorphoses” ("The Petrification of Phineus and his Friend") 
 Symphony No. 6 in A after Ovid's “Metamorphoses” ("The Transformation of the Lycian Peasants into Frogs")
 Sinfonia Concerto for Viola, Contrabass and Orchestra in E flat major

Chamber music 
 15 Divertimenti (Il combattimento dell'umane passioni is in this collection)
 5 Cassazioni (2 published: Paris, 1768; the other 3 are MS)
 4 Serenate for 2 Horns and Strings
 35 Partite for Winds Instruments
 Petit Ballet en forme d'une contredanse
 24 dances for the Redoutensaal (1794)
 6 String Quintets for 2 vl., vla., vcl., ctbs. (1782)
 Sonata da camera a 5 stromenti
 6 String Quartets  (1789)
 Quartet in E flat major
 6 Sonatas  for 2 vl. and vla. Op. 2 (Amsterdam, s. d.)
 6 Trios  for 2 vl. and b. op. 6 (Paris, 1771)
 Another 12 Trios (id.)
 3 Trios  for vl., vla. and vcl.
 Sonata for vl.
 2 Duets for 2 vl.
 Duet for vla. and vcl. or ctbs. in E flat major
 14 duets for vl. and bass
 136 pieces for Piano
 Divertimento for two Violins and Violoncello in E flat major
 Notturno (in D) for 4 flutes

Operas 
 Amore in Musica (1766, Grosswardein)
 Arcifanfano, rè de’ Matti (1774 Johannisberg; 1776 Eszterházy)
 25 000 Gulden oder im Dunkeln ist gut munkeln (1785, Vienna)
 Doktor und Apotheker (1786, Vienna) (Digital edition by the University and State Library Düsseldorf) 
 Betrug durch Aberglauben (1786, Vienna)
 Die Liebe im Narrenhaus (1787, Vienna)
 Das rote Käppchen (1788, Vienna)
 Hieronymus Knicker (1789, Vienna)
 Das Gespenst mit der Trommel (1794, Oels)
 Don Quixote der Zweyte (1795, Oels)
 Die lustigen Weiber von Windsor (1796, Oels)
 Der Mädchenmarkt (1797)
 Die Opera Buffa (1798)

Oratorios 
 Isacco figura del Redentore – in Latin (Grosswardein, 1766)
 Davide penitente – in Italian (Johannisberg, 1770)
 La Liberatrice del Popolo Giudaico nella Persia, o sia l’Esther- in Italian  (Vienna, 1773)
 Giobbe – in Italian (Vienna, 1786)

Cantatas 
 Auf das... Geburtsfest seiner Majestät des Königs (1781)
 Auf Lichtmess
 11 other cantatas

Sacred music 
 Missa in C major
 Missa a 4 v.
 Missa gratiosa in C major
 Missa in D major
 12 other masses
 2 Requiem Masses in C minor (1780/1784)
 11 offertories
 Antiphony with choir, orchestra and organ
 8 litanies
 12 ariae ex canticis Salomonis (Augsburg, 1795)
 170 other sacred music works: arias, graduals, motets et cetera.
 the aria Das Mädchen von Köln (from Ossian; Leipzig, 1795)
 3 other arias for Soprano and orchestra

Other works 
 Pastoral-Motette

Discography 
 Sinfonias on Ovid's Metamorphoses, Nos 1–3, Failoni Orchestra, Hanspeter Gmür, 1995, Naxos Nx 8553368
 Sinfonias on Ovid's Metamorphoses, Nos 4–6, Failoni Orchestra, Hanspeter Gmür, 1995, Naxos Nx 8553369 (The numerals for Sinfonias 5 & 6 are incorrectly transposed on this disc)
 Sinfonias. Grave d1, Grave F7, Grave g1, Failoni Orchestra, Uwe Grodd, 1996, Naxos Nx 8553974
 Sinfonias. Grave a2, Grave D16, Grave A10, Failoni Orchestra, Uwe Grodd, 1996, Naxos Nx 8553975
 Symphonies. C and D; Concertos. Flute and Double-Bass, Oradea Philharmonic, Miron Rațiu, Olympia OCD 405
 Symphonies. C, D, and a; Serenade. Oradea Philharmonic, Miron Rațiu, Olympia OCD 425
 Symphonies. e, E-flat, E, A, D, Oradea Philharmonic Orchestra, Romeo Rímbu, Olympia, OCD 426
 String Quartets 1 & 3–5, Franz Schubert Quartet, 1989, cpo 999 038-2
 String Quartets 2 & 6, String Quintets in C & G, Franz Schubert Quartet, 1992, cpo 999 122–2
 Geistliche Musik (Requiem, Offertorium zu Ehren des Heiligen Johann von Nepomuk, Lauretanische Litanei), Regensburger Domspatzen, Consortium musicum München, Georg Ratzinger, 1996 + 1987, Freiburger Musikforum / ars musici AM 1158-2
 Sinfonien in D, Es, A, Lisbon Metropolitan Orchestra, Alvaro Cassuto, 2006, Naxos
 Double Bass Concertos, Swedish Chamber Orchestra, Paul Goodwin, Chi-chi Nwanoku, 2000, hyperion
 Sinfonies Exprimant (Les Metamorphoses D’Ovide) Nos 1–6, Prague Chamber Orchestra, Bohumil Gregor, 1988 Supraphon
 Symphonies after Ovid's Metamorphoses, Nos 1–6, Cantilena, Adrian Shepherd, 1986, Chandos 8564/5

See also 
 Wenzel Müller
 Johann Baptist Wanhal

Notes

References 
 Miller, Norbert (ed.). 1967. Karl Ditters von Dittersdorf Lebensbeschreibung. Seinem Sohne in die Feder diktiert. Munich: Kösel-Verlag.
 Rice, John A., "New Light on Dittersdorf's Ovid Symphonies," Studi musical 29 (2000), 453-92.
 Stübler, Klaus, and Christine Wolf (eds.). 2004. Harenberg Komponistenlexikon: 760 Komponisten und ihr Werk; mit 1060 Meilensteinen der Musik sowie kommentierten CD-Tipps der Redaktion "Fono Forum", pp. 258–59. Mannheim: Mayers Lexikonverlag. .
 Udolph, Ludger (ed.). 1999. Karl von Dittersdorfs Lebensbeschreibungen. Seinem Sohne in die Feder diktiert. Deutsche Bibliothek des Ostens. Munich: Langen Müller. .
 Unverricht, Hubert (ed.) 1989. Carl Ditters von Dittersdorf 1739–1799. Mozarts Rivale in der Oper. Würzburg: Bergstadtverlag W.G. Korn. .

External links 

 
 Carl (Karl) Ditters von Dittersdorf, biographical sketch
 Carl Ditters von Dittersdorf on NAXOS.com 
 www.karadar.com/Dictionary/dittersdorf.html Karadar Classical Music Dictionary
 

Media
 Sonate A-Dur By Karl Ditters Von Dittersdorf (1739–1799). Published by Doblinger Music Publishers (DB.DM-01196)

 "Ouverture" from the "Hocus Pocus" comic opera (1790)

1739 births
1799 deaths
18th-century Austrian musicians
18th-century Austrian male musicians
18th-century classical composers
18th-century German musicians
Austrian classical musicians
Austrian untitled nobility
Austrian Classical-period composers
People from Mariahilf
Austrian male classical composers
String quartet composers
Composers for double bass